The Patarava is a Georgian family name from the Guria region in the western Georgia.

The Patarava family name comes from these towns of Guria: Baileti, Ganakhleba, Guturi, Gurianta, Zomleti, Likhauri, Natanebi, Ozurgeti, Sameba, Shemokmedi, Dzimiti and Tchanieti.

References 

Georgian-language surnames